The 2014 Brasil Open Grand Prix was the eleventh grand prix badminton tournament of the 2014 BWF Grand Prix Gold and Grand Prix. The tournament was held in Gymnasium of Comissão de Desporto da Aeronáutica (CDA), Rio de Janeiro, Brazil from 5 until 10 August 2014 and had a total purse of $50,000. This tournament organized by Confederação Brasileira de Badminton (CBBd), and sanctioned from the BWF. The sponsor of this tournament was the Brazilian Air Force,  and Yonex. 130 players from 27 countries competed at this tournament.

Men's singles

Seeds

  Henri Hurskainen (semifinals)
  Dieter Domke (finals)
  Osleni Guerrero (semifinals)
  Scott Evans (champion)
  Sattawat Pongnairat (quarterfinals)
  Petr Koukal (quarterfinals)
  Joachim Persson (quarterfinals)
  Daniel Paiola (quarterfinals)

Finals

Women's singles

Seeds

  Beiwen Zhang (champion)
  Linda Zetchiri (withdrew)
  Karin Schnaase (quarterfinals)
  Chloe Magee (second round)

Finals

Men's doubles

Seeds

 Phillip Chew / Sattawat Pongnairat (second round)
 Matijs Dierickx / Freek Golinski (semifinals)
 Giovanni Greco / Rosario Maddaloni (second round)

Finals

Women's doubles

Seeds

 Gabriela Stoeva / Stefani Stoeva (finals)
 Eva Lee / Paula Lynn Obanana (semifinals)

Finals

Mixed doubles

Seeds

 Max Schwenger / Carla Nelte (champion)
 Sam Magee / Chloe Magee (finals)
 Phillip Chew / Jamie Subandhi (quarterfinals)
 Nico Ruponen / Amanda Hogstrom (second round)

Finals

References

External links
 Tournament info at badminton.org.br 
 Tournament draw at tournamentsoftware.com

Brasil Open (badminton)
BWF Grand Prix Gold and Grand Prix
Brasil Open Grand Prix